1969 in the Philippines details events of note that happened in the Philippines in 1969.

Incumbents

 President: Ferdinand Marcos (Nacionalista Party)
 Vice President: Fernando Lopez (Nacionalista Party)
House Speaker: José Laurel, Jr.
 Chief Justice: Roberto Concepcion
 Congress: 6th (until June 17)

Events

March
 March 29 – The New People's Army is formed by merging of Jose Maria Sison's revolutionary band with Bernabe Buscayno's Huk's peasant's army.

May
 May 11 – Tuguegarao, Cagayan experiences a heatwave with a recorded temperature of 42.2 °C.

June
 June 21 – The province of Western Samar is renamed to Samar by virtue of Republic Act No. 5650.

July
 July 26 – United States President Richard Nixon visits the Philippines.

September
 September 12 – A Philippine Airlines plane hits a tree and crashes on a hill in Antipolo, Rizal, killing 45 of 47 people on board. It is then the country's second worst air accident.

November
 November 11 – In the nationwide general elections held, incumbents Pres. Marcos and Vice Pres. Lopez are reelected in their respective positions, with the former as the first (and the last in electoral history) to win for a second full term as president in the presidential elections and the latter elected to a third full term as Vice President of the Philippines. The administration party, the Nacionalista Party, won 6 out of 8 seats in the Philippine Senate and 88 out of 110 seats in the House of Representatives.

Holidays

As per Act No. 2711 section 29, issued on March 10, 1917, any legal holiday of fixed date falls on Sunday, the next succeeding day shall be observed as legal holiday. Sundays are also considered legal religious holidays. Bonifacio Day was added through Philippine Legislature Act No. 2946. It was signed by then-Governor General Francis Burton Harrison in 1921. As per Republic Act No. 3022, April 9th is proclaimed as Bataan Day. Independence Day was changed from July 4 (Philippine Republic Day) to June 12 (Philippine Independence Day) on August 4, 1964.

 January 1 – New Year's Day
 February 22 – Legal Holiday
 April 3 – Maundy Thursday
 April 4 – Good Friday
 April 9 – Araw ng Kagitingan (Day of Valor)
 May 1 – Labor Day
 June 12 – Independence Day 
 July 4 – Philippine Republic Day
 August 13  – Legal Holiday
 November 27 – Thanksgiving Day
 November 30 – Bonifacio Day
 December 25 – Christmas Day
 December 30 – Rizal Day

Entertainment and culture
 July 19 – Miss Philippines Gloria Diaz is crowned as the  first filipina to win Miss Universe 1969 which was held in Long Beach, California, United States.
 September 10 – The Cultural Center of the Philippines is inaugurated, located along Manila Bay.
 October 15 – DZKB-TV Channel 9 is launched by Kanalon Broadcasting System (now Radio Philippines Network), a Philippine TV station, owned by Roberto S. Benedicto.

Births

 January 2 – Dean Francis Alfar, author
 January 3 – Bayani Agbayani, actor, singer, and comedian
 January 14 – Vergel Meneses, basketball player and politician

 March 4 – Dawn Zulueta, Filipino actress
 March 10 – Rolando Andaya Jr., Filipino lawyer and politician (d. 2022)
 March 20 – Ruffy Biazon, Filipino politician
 March 31 – Maritoni Fernandez, actress

 April 13 – Juan Miguel Zubiri, Filipino businessman and politician
 April 26 – Mikey Arroyo, Filipino politician and actor

 May 12 – Eileen Ermita-Buhain, Filipino politician
 May 31 – Ace Barbers, Filipino politician
 May 15 – Lovely Rivero

 June 19 – Nancy Catamco, Filipina politician
 June 30 – Mike Defensor, Filipino politician

 July 3 – Kaka Bag-ao, Filipina human rights lawyer and politician
 July 13 – Vicky Morales, Filipina television journalist and news anchor
 July 25 – Blakdyak, singer, actor and comedian (d. 2016)
 July 28 – Alice Dixson, Filipino actress

 August 3 – Lani Misalucha, Filipina singer
 August 5 – Romulo Peña Jr., Filipino politician
 August 12 – Aga Muhlach, Filipino actor
 August 22 – Jean Garcia, Filipino actress

 September 1 – Galo Ador Jr., Filipino comic writer (d. 2008)
 September 5 – Amy Perez, Filipino actress and TV host
 September 16 – Janno Gibbs, Filipino actor, comedian, and singer

 October 8:
 Arthur Defensor Jr., Filipino politician
 Freddie Abuda, Filipino basketball player
 October 10 – Francis Escudero, Filipino politician

 November 8 – Gardo Versoza, actor
 November 22 – Chin Chin Gutierrez, actress and environmentalist
 November 23 – Robin Padilla, Filipino actor, producer 

 December 17 – Michael V., Filipino comedian and actor
 December 26 – JV Ejercito, Filipino politician

Deaths
 March 31 – Botong Francisco, Filipino muralist (b. 1914)
 June 5 – Simeon Toribio, Filipino athlete (b. 1905)
 August 26 – Alejandro G. Abadilla, Filipino poet and essayist (b. 1906)

References